Shahrak-e Majlesi (also Romanized as Shahrak-e Majlesī; also known as Shahr-e Majlesī), in the Central District of Mobarakeh County, Isfahan Province, Iran. At the 2006 census, its population was 2,659, in 662 families.

References 

Populated places in Mobarakeh County